Miki Sings Billie: A Tribute to Billie Holiday is a studio album by American R&B singer Miki Howard. Released in 1993 by Giant Records, the album peaked at No. 72 on Billboard's Top R&B Albums chart. The album is a tribute to jazz singer Billie Holiday, Howard covers some of her favorite songs recorded by Holiday.

Track listing

Film
 In 1992, Miki Howard portrayed jazz legend Billie Holiday in Spike Lee's Malcolm X, singing Holiday's "I Cover the Waterfront".

Charts

References

External links
mikihowardmedia.com

1993 albums
Miki Howard albums
Giant Records (Warner) albums